Lapscheure is a town in Damme, a municipality in the province of West Flanders, Belgium.

External links
Lapscheure @ City Review

Populated places in West Flanders
Damme